The Hejazi goat breed from Arabia is used for the production of meat.

Sources
Hejazi Goat

Goat breeds
Meat goat breeds